Paul Weis (19 March 1907 – 6 February 1991) was an Austrian lawyer and survivor of the persecution by the Nazis. He is dubbed to be the "founding father of the protection".

Life 
Weis was born in Vienna on 19 March 1907. He was interned at concentration camp Dachau and moved to the UK after his release. During the war, he was a member of the Committee on the Status of Stateless Persons of the Grotius Society and secretary of the Free Austrian Movement. From 1944-1947, he was secretary of the Legal Section of the Research Committee of the World Jewish Congress. He served as a legal advisor to the International Refugee Organization, a specialized agency created to assist refugees from 1947 until 1951, and then as the head of the legal department of the Office of the United Nations High Commissioner for Refugees (UNHCR). He also served on the Ad Hoc Committee on Statelessness and Related Problems at Lake Success in New York, which produced the Convention Relating to the Status of Refugees.
 He contributed groundbreaking work on international law, in particular to the right of asylum and refugee law.  His monograph "Nationality and statelessness in international law" is a standard work.

He died on 6 February 1991 in Geneva.

For his work relating to the rights of refugees, Weis was awarded the Nansen Refugee Award posthumously in 1991.

Publications

Monographs 
 Nationality and statelessness in international law. Stevens, London 1956 (English).

Awards 
 1991: Nansen Refugee Award (posthumously)Nansen Refugee Award

References 

Austrian officials of the United Nations
1907 births
1991 deaths
Lawyers from Vienna
Austrian humanitarians
Dachau concentration camp survivors
20th-century Austrian lawyers
Nansen Refugee Award laureates